Fabrizio Zilibotti (born September 7, 1964) is an Italian economist. He is the Tuntex Professor of International and Development Economics at Yale University. Zilibotti was previously Professor of Economics at University College London, the University of Zürich, and at the Institute for International Economic Studies in Stockholm. 

He has been a co-editor of Econometrica, managing editor of the Review of Economic Studies (2002-2006), and chief editor of the Journal of the European Economic Association (2009-2014). In addition, he is an Associate Editor of the Journal of Economic Growth and of China Economic Review. He is a fellow of the Econometric Society, of the NBER and of the CEPR, and a member of the Academia Europaea honoris causa. In 2016, Zilibotti was the President of the European Economic Association.

Early life and education 
Zilibotti earned a Laurea in Political Science at the Università di Bologna (1989), and a Master of Science (1991) and a Ph.D. (1994) of economics at the London School of Economics. His doctoral thesis was titled "Endogenous growth and underdevelopment traps: A theoretical and empirical analysis." 

His academic career includes professorships at European universities such as Universitat Pompeu Fabra, University College London, and the IIES-Stockholm University. He has also held visiting positions at Bocconi University (“Tommaso Padoa-Schioppa Visiting Professorship”), Tsinghua University (“Mr. and Mrs. Tien Oung Liu Distinguished Visiting Professorship”) and the Universities of Oslo, Bologna, Southampton, and CERGE-EI Prague. His most recent appointment was a chair at the University of Zurich.

Selected publications 
His research interests include economic growth and development, the economic development of China, political economy, macroeconomics, international economics, and economics and culture.

Research in progress

References

External links 
 Zilibotti webpage

1964 births
Living people
21st-century  Italian economists
20th-century  Italian economists
University of Bologna alumni
Alumni of the London School of Economics
Academic staff of Pompeu Fabra University
Academic staff of Stockholm University
Academics of the University of Southampton
Academics of University College London
Academic staff of the University of Oslo
Academic staff of the University of Zurich
Fellows of the Econometric Society
Members of Academia Europaea
Fellows of the European Economic Association